A Venus-crosser is an asteroid whose orbit crosses that of Venus. There are 2,809 Venus-crosser and 98 outer-grazers known. Mercury-crossers or grazers are marked ‡.

Venus also has a quasi-satellite, (524522) 2002 VE68. This asteroid is also a Mercury- and Earth-crosser; it seems to have been a "companion" to Venus for the last 7,000 years or so only, and is destined to be ejected from this orbital arrangement about 500 years from now.

Crossers

Grazers

See also
List of Mercury-crossing minor planets
List of Earth-crossing minor planets
List of Mars-crossing minor planets
List of Jupiter-crossing minor planets
List of Saturn-crossing minor planets
List of Uranus-crossing minor planets
List of Neptune-crossing minor planets

References

External links 
 Very Close Approaches (< 0.01 AU) of PHAs to Venus 1900–2200
 Upcoming Close Approaches (< 0.10 AU) of Near-Earth Objects to Venus

Minor planet groups and families
 
Lists of minor planets
Minor planets